Richard Borg is a game designer who has designed many wargames.  In 2010, he was elected to the Charles Roberts Awards Hall of Fame.

Games that Richard Borg has designed or co-designed include the following:
 Liar's Dice, 1993 Spiel des Jahres winner
2000 Battle Cry (2001 International Gamers Award winner for General Strategy, 2-Player category) 
2000 Hera and Zeus (2001 International Gamers Award winner for General Strategy, 2-Player)
2001 Wyatt Earp with Mike Fitzgerald (2001 Meeples' Choice Award)
2004 Memoir '44 (2004 International Gamers Award winner for General Strategy, 2-Player category and The Wargamer 2004 Award for Excellence)
2006 BattleLore (First Edition) (2007 International Gamers Award winner for General Strategy, 2-Player)
2006 Commands & Colors: Ancients (2006 Origins Award winner for Historical Board Game of the Year)
2007 Stonehenge designed with prominent game designers Richard Garfield, Bruno Faidutti, James Ernest, and Mike Selinker.
2010 Commands & Colors: Napoleonics (2012 Games Magazine Best New Historical Simulation Game Winner)
2012 Samurai Battles (2013 Origins Awards, Best Historical Board Game Winner)

Games that he designed with award-winning game designer Alan R. Moon include Warriors, Gracias, and Wongar.

References

External links
 

Living people
Board game designers
1948 births